The 1933–34 Western Kentucky State Teachers Hilltoppers men's basketball team represented Western Kentucky State Normal School and Teachers College (now known as Western Kentucky University) during the 1933-34 NCAA basketball season. The team was led by future Naismith Memorial Basketball Hall of Fame coach Edgar Diddle.  The Hilltoppers won the Kentucky Intercollegiate Athletic Conference and Southern Intercollegiate Athletic Association championships, and led NCAA in wins.  Harry Hardin, Thomas Hobbs, and future Louisville Cardinals men's basketball coach, Bernard “Peck” Hickman were selected to the All-SIAA team, and Hardin and Hickman were named to the All-State team.

Schedule

|-
!colspan=6| 1934 Kentucky Intercollegiate Athletic Conference Tournament

|-
!colspan=6| 1934 Southern Intercollegiate Athletic Association Tournament

References

Western Kentucky Hilltoppers basketball seasons
Western Kentucky State Teachers
Western Kentucky State Teachers
Western Kentucky State Teachers